Ángel Paul Conde Soto (born July 9, 1989, in Guadalajara, Jalisco, Mexico) is a Mexican professional footballer who plays for Sonora of Ascenso MX on loan from Tijuana.

External links

1989 births
Living people
Footballers from Guadalajara, Jalisco
Mexican footballers
Correcaminos UAT footballers
Coras de Nayarit F.C. footballers
Cimarrones de Sonora players
Liga MX players
Association footballers not categorized by position